Hermann Herbold (3 November 1906 – 29 March 1985) was a German rower. He competed in the men's eight event at the 1928 Summer Olympics.

References

1906 births
1985 deaths
German male rowers
Olympic rowers of Germany
Rowers at the 1928 Summer Olympics
Sportspeople from Mannheim